Jacques Henley (born Jacques Dhote) was a French actor.

Selected filmography
 Our Masters, the Servants (1930)
 The Mystery of the Villa Rose (1930)
 The Threepenny Opera (1931)
 The Yellow Dog (1932)
 The Regiment's Champion (1932)
 Koenigsmark (1935)
 Parisian Life (1936)
 Street of Shadows (1937)
 Ultimatum (1938)
 Return at Dawn (1938)
 Serge Panine (1939)
 The Five Cents of Lavarede (1939)
 Entente cordiale (1939)
 Monsieur Hector (1940)
 Jericho (1946)
 Captain Blomet (1947)
Judicial Error (1948)
 The Red Angel (1949)

External links

Year of birth unknown
Year of death unknown
French male film actors
20th-century French male actors